Cladonia mongkolsukii is a species of lichen in the family Cladoniaceae. Found in lower-elevation montane scrub forests of Thailand, it was described as new to science in 2011. The specific epithet honors Pachara Mongolsuk, a Thai lichenologist.

References

mongkolsukii
Lichens described in 2011
Lichens of Asia
Lichen species
Taxa named by Teuvo Ahti